Murray County is a county located in the northwestern part of the U.S. state of Georgia. As of the 2020 census, the population was 39,973. The county seat is Chatsworth.

Murray County is part of the Dalton, GA Metropolitan Statistical Area, which is also included in the Chattanooga-Cleveland-Dalton, TN-GA-AL Combined Statistical Area.

History
In December, 1832 the Georgia General Assembly designated the extreme northwestern corner of the state as Murray County.  Formerly part of Cherokee County, the area was named for a distinguished Georgia statesman from Lincoln County, Mr. Thomas W. Murray, a former speaker of the Georgia House.  Within a short time the legislature found the county was too large to administer properly as the population grew, for the county then included what is now Dade, Walker, Catoosa, Whitfield, Murray, Gordon and parts of Bartow and Chatooga Counties, so further division became necessary.    Within two decades, Murray County came to be  of land with Spring Place as its county seat until the railroad was built through Chatsworth. With Chatsworth more accessible, the county seat was moved there.

Cherokees
The area was in the heart of the Cherokee Nation at the time the boundary lines were drawn through the territory.  Not until after the Cherokees were removed in 1838–39 did white settlers enter the county in large numbers.  Spring Place had been established in 1801 as a Moravian mission to the Cherokee and had been a post office since 1810 – the second oldest in North Georgia.  After the Cherokee removal, the Moravians relocated with the tribe in what is now Oklahoma to establish New Springplace near the town of Oaks, Oklahoma.  Sometime during the late 19th century, James B. Brackett donated the land upon which the Brackett Indian School was built.  The school did not always function as a segregated Indian school.  At one point in its previously integrated history it was referred to as the Lone Cherry School.

The Bracketts were a notable Eastern Cherokee family that lived along Brackett's Ridges, amongst several other American Indian families, several of which were also Eastern Cherokee.  Most of the Bracketts were forced to leave Georgia during the Trail of Tears earlier in the 19th century; however, some of them returned to Georgia several years later.  James Brackett's brother Adam Brackett, along with several other siblings show up on the Dawes Rolls as being enrolled members of the Cherokee Nation of Oklahoma.

Civil War
At the outbreak of the American Civil War, Murray County had no industry and very little wealth. When Georgia seceded from the Union, hundreds of men and boys from Murray enlisted in the Confederate Army. The following units were from Murray County:
 3rd Battalion, Georgia Infantry, Company B, Spring Place Volunteers
 11th Regiment, Georgia Infantry, Company C, Murray Rifle Company
 22nd Regiment, Georgia Infantry, Company D
 37th Regiment, Georgia Infantry, Company A
 39th Regiment, Georgia Infantry, Company A, Cohutta Rangers
 39th Regiment, Georgia Infantry, Company B
 19th State Troops – Capt. John Oats Company
In 1864, two skirmishes between Union and Confederate soldiers took place just to the west of Spring Place, one of which took place on June 25, 1864, with the 8th Michigan Cavalry US. The First Tennessee Cavalry CS also skirmished about 5 miles north of Spring Place on April 19, 1864. Another skirmish took place near Westfield late during the night of August 22, 1864. Captain Woody of the Murray County Home Guard was reported wounded.

On February 27, 1865, and April 20, 1865, there was a skirmish at Spring Place between Confederates and the 145th Indiana Infantry US. This was followed by a skirmish on Holly Creek on March 1, 1865. By 1865 Spring Place was known as an area occupied by Confederate Guerrillas. During March 20–22, 1865 Union soldiers made an attempt to suppress this activity.

Railroad
In 1906, after two earlier attempts at building a railroad in Murray County had failed, the Louisville and Nashville line was built to run north to south through the entire length of the county.  Murray grew, with new towns developing along the railroad. One of these new towns was named Chatsworth.  With the new railroad line in place, timber could be shipped out of the mountains, and talc deposits, discovered in the 1870s, was able to be mined and the ore shipped throughout the country.

The old county seat of Spring Place was bypassed by the railroad.  Some Murray Countians began an effort to move the county seat to the more central and accessible railroad town of Chatsworth.  Much dissention was caused by this effort.  A county-wide referendum was held on the matter in 1912, which resulted in Chatsworth being named as the seat of local government, where it remains to present day.

Into the twentieth century, Murray remained predominantly agricultural.  Shortly after World War II the textile industry, prevalent in neighboring Whitfield County, began to move into Murray.  Today, the carpet industry is the predominant employer in Murray County.

Geography

The majority of Murray County is located in the Conasauga River sub-basin in the ACT River Basin (Coosa-Tallapoosa River Basin), and the southeastern corner of the county is located in the Coosawattee River sub-basin of the same larger ACT River Basin.

Major highways

  U.S. Route 76
  U.S. Route 411
  State Route 2
  State Route 52
  State Route 52 Alternate
  State Route 61
  State Route 136
  State Route 225
  State Route 282
  State Route 286

Adjacent counties
 Polk County, Tennessee (northeast)
 Fannin County (east-northeast)
 Gilmer County (east)
 Gordon County (south)
 Whitfield County (west)
 Bradley County, Tennessee (northwest)

National protected area
 Chattahoochee National Forest (part)

Demographics

2000 census
As of the census of 2000, there were 36,506 people, 13,286 households, and 10,256 families living in the county. The population density was 41/km2 (106/mi2). There were 14,320 housing units at an average density of 16/km2 (42/mi2). The racial makeup of the county was 95.30% White, 0.62% Black or African American, 0.29% Native American, 0.25% Asian, 0.01% Pacific Islander, 2.64% from other races, and 0.88% from two or more races. 5.49% of the population were Hispanic or Latino of any race.

There were 13,286 households, out of which 39.00% had children under the age of 18 living with them, 60.80% were married couples living together, 11.10% had a female householder with no husband present, and 22.80% were non-families. 18.80% of all households were made up of individuals, and 6.00% had someone living alone who was 65 years of age or older.  The average household size was 2.73 and the average family size was 3.10.

In the county, the population was spread out, with 28.00% under the age of 18, 9.50% from 18 to 24, 33.00% from 25 to 44, 21.50% from 45 to 64, and 8.00% who were 65 years of age or older. The median age was 33 years. For every 100 females, there were 99.90 males. For every 100 females age 18 and over, there were 97.50 males.

The median income for a household in the county was $36,996, and the median income for a family was $42,155. Males had a median income of $29,812 versus $23,035 for females. The per capita income for the county was $16,230. About 9.20% of families and 12.70% of the population were below the poverty line, including 15.90% of those under age 18 and 19.40% of those age 65 or over.

2010 census
As of the 2010 United States Census, there were 39,628 people, 14,080 households, and 10,677 families living in the county. The racial makeup of the county was 89.1% white, 0.6% black or African American, 0.4% American Indian, 0.3% Asian, 0.1% Pacific islander, 7.9% from other races, and 1.6% from two or more races. Those of Hispanic or Latino origin made up 13.0% of the population. In terms of ancestry, 40.1% were American, 8.8% were Irish, 7.8% were English, and 5.0% were German.

Of the 14,080 households, 39.9% had children under the age of 18 living with them, 56.6% were married couples living together, 12.8% had a female householder with no husband present, 24.2% were non-families, and 19.8% of all households were made up of individuals. The average household size was 2.80 and the average family size was 3.20. The median age was 36.2 years.

The median income for a household in the county was $38,226 and the median income for a family was $45,420. Males had a median income of $33,543 versus $27,797 for females. The per capita income for the county was $16,925. About 14.3% of families and 17.1% of the population were below the poverty line, including 23.1% of those under age 18 and 12.9% of those age 65 or over.

2020 census

As of the 2020 United States census, there were 39,973 people, 14,385 households, and 10,557 families residing in the county.

Attractions

The Chief Vann House Historic Site at Spring Place. Constructed in 1805 for James Vann, a Cherokee chief, the two-story red brick home was built alongside the Federal Road, a major early path in northwest Georgia.

Fort Mountain State Park. A  park in the Cohutta Mountains.

Another major asset is the Chattahoochee National Forest, which occupies a large portion of northeastern Murray County. Within the forest is the Cohutta Wilderness Area, a roadless, mountainous landscape featuring several of Georgia's premier backpacking trails.

Carters Lake, on the Coosawatee River, was formed by the Carter Dam, which is the largest earth-rock dam east of the Mississippi. The  lake attracts fishermen, boaters and campers.

Communities

City
 Chatsworth (county seat)

Town
 Eton

Unincorporated communities
 Carters
 Cisco
 Crandall (incorporated until 1995)
 Ramhurst
 Spring Place
 Sumac
 Tennga

Media
Murray County, Georgia has been featured in an Independent Lens series documenting bullying.

Politics

See also

 National Register of Historic Places listings in Murray County, Georgia
List of counties in Georgia

References

External links
 https://web.archive.org/web/20100207163414/http://murraycountychamber.org/history2.htm
 https://web.archive.org/web/20080807015831/http://www.ourchatsworth.com/
 http://www.murraycountymuseum.com
 http://www.chatsworthtimes.com
  Murray County Genealogy & History
 Murray County Website

 
Georgia (U.S. state) counties
1832 establishments in Georgia (U.S. state)
Populated places established in 1832
Dalton metropolitan area, Georgia
Northwest Georgia (U.S.)
Counties of Appalachia